Lauca is a  high andesitic stratovolcano in the Central Volcanic Zone of the Andes on the Altiplano in northern Chile. Administratively it is located in Putre, Arica y Parinacota Region. The volcano was active during the Late Miocene from 10.5 million years ago onwards. A major ignimbrite collapsed the volcano in the Late Pliocene.

Geology 
Andesites from the Lauca volcano, active in the Late Miocene as of 10.5 million years ago, exist in two groups, plagioclase rich ones which underwent alteration and fine grained silicic ones that are fresher. Amphibole rich lava flows formed a uniform volcanic cone. A later major ignimbrite eruption caused the collapse of the centre and formed the Lauca ignimbrite. A caldera is present, with a lava dome at the northeastern rim.

Ar-Ar ages for this rhyolitic ignimbrite have been determined at 2.73 ± 0.02 Ma based on sanidine analysis and 2.87 ± 0.05 Ma from biotite. The Lauca ignimbrite has been correlated to the Pérez ignimbrite in Bolivia and the Pachía ignimbrite in southern Peru. In parts, the Lauca ignimbrite is covered by conglomeratic terrace deposits.

See also 

 Caldera Lauca
 Lauca National Park
 Lauca River
 Lake Tauca

References

Bibliography 
 
 
 
 
 
 

Volcanoes of Arica y Parinacota Region
Miocene stratovolcanoes
Pliocene stratovolcanoes